Dede-Tala (Deede Tala) is a rural locality (an ulus) in Zaigrayevsky District, Republic of Buryatia, Russia. The population was 75 as of 2010. There are 2 streets.

Geography 
Dede-Tala is located 54 km southeast of Zaigrayevo (the district's administrative centre) by road. Lesozavodskoy is the nearest rural locality.

References 

Rural localities in Zaigrayevsky District